Kadrî of Pergamon, 16th century Ottoman linguist, author of the first grammar book on Ottoman language.

Although little is known about the life of Kadrî, it is assumed that he was born in Bergama (Pergamon) and later moved to Constantinople (Istanbul). In Constantinople, around 1530-1531 (Hijri 937), he wrote Müyessire el-'Ulûm(tr), his famous work on the grammar of the Turkish language. The fact that it covered all elementary grammar rules of the Turkish language and structure made it an important work for the linguistic history of the Turkish language.

Linguists from the Ottoman Empire
Ottoman Turkish language
Year of death unknown
Year of birth unknown
Non-fiction writers from the Ottoman Empire